Shepherding is a tactic and skill in Australian rules football, a team sport.
Shepherding is the act of legally pushing, bumping or blocking an opposing player from gaining possession of the ball or reaching the contest.

The term originates from the word shepherd, someone who influences the movement of sheep in a paddock.  Through shepherding, Australian football players are able to influence the movement of their opponents.

The prevalence of shepherding is distinctive in Australian rules football as it is an illegal form of play in many other codes of football where it is subject to obstruction rules.  It is completely banned in soccer.  In rugby, it is illegal to tackle or obstruct any player not carrying the ball. Ice hockey allows body checking only on a player in possession (until the puck reaches any other player), as does gaelic football.  The concept of shepherding, however, is very similar to blocking in American Football.

Under the Laws of Australian Football, a player can shepherd an opposition player when the ball is within five metres, with the exception of contests where players contest the ball in the air, i.e. marking contests and ruck contests, or when the ball is not in play. Players cannot shepherd in marking and ruck contests. Players may not make high or low contact during a shepherd, nor hold their opponents; free kicks should result from any of these infractions.  Nevertheless, there have been a number of incidents in the professional Australian Football League which have caused controversy and have resulted in the rules regarding shepherding to be more strictly applied behind play.

Shepherding is classified as a "one percenter" skill and is an important aspect of team play.

Because shepherding can be applied regardless of whether the player is in possession, this gives players the choice of "playing the man" and not the ball.  In circumstances where two players contest a loose ball, a player in an inferior position or with a weight advantage might decide to take his opponent out first and then to retrieve the ball.  Others, however, may have no intentions for the ball at all and simply aim to hurt their opponent.  Although correct technique can be taught, given the high speed all directional nature of the game, the decision to make the ball the primary objective and the execution of a bump is often a split second tactical decision and left to player instinct.   The decision process effects the way players are perceived.  A player may be commended for their protection of their teammates, setting up play and controlled aggression.  At the same time players who bump but do not contest the ball too often can be seen by some as "dirty" and unsportsmanlike (See "Australian rules football culture").

Techniques and Tactics
There are varied techniques of shepherding:

Bumping
A player can legally bump (also known as a hip-and-shoulder move) any opponent (not just the player in possession) who is within five metres of the ball. Charging a player is not a legal bump and is penalised with a free kick and can be reported, regardless of whether the ball is within five metres or not. Though generally, a charge will tend occur outside five metres and other criteria are taken into account, such as: severity of contact, intent or recklessness, and injury caused.

As bumps can cause serious injury, there are rules to protect players, particularly to protect the head of a player being bumped.  Mid-air collisions can happen in a marking contest when players are committed to the ball, however these collisions are considered accidental or incidental when players make the ball their sole objective.

Although arm contact is allowed whilst shepherding, no contact can be made with the head of an opponent whilst bumping. Incidental clashes of heads can sometimes happen when players bump or collide at full speed and this can cause serious head or facial injuries.

A front on charge is often called a shirt front and is an illegal and reportable offense (but again, often subject to interpretation).

Bumps can come from any direction and are often unexpected by a recipient.  Playing the game therefore requires considerable courage, as little padding is worn by players to protect their bodies from high impact collisions.  It is generally deemed the responsibility of anyone in play to protect themselves from bumps.  If a players lines up and charges (run-up and attack) an opponent for a bump, they can be reported for "charging".

Bumping is often described as happening behind the play, meaning that unless it occurs during a contest for the ball, it is not always the focus of television cameras or spectators.  This can also makes it difficult for field umpires to detect infringements. An umpire will often call "fair bump", or "play on" in response to a legal bump.  If a bump is late and the player has already kicked the ball, then it often results in a relayed free kick, which is given to a player on the same team further towards their goal.

Shepherding
Shepherding typically involves a player using their whole body to stop an opponent from reaching a contest, and usually to stop an opponent from tackling a teammate or getting to the ball.  The most effective shepherding is done with outstretched stiff arms and use of strength and body weight between the player and their teammate.

Blocking
Players may hold their ground in marking or ruck contests but it is illegal to block an opposition player's run at the ball. Use of the hands in the back to hold ground is illegal in the AFL but is legal under the Laws of Australian Football and is not penalised in other leagues.

Bumps vs Tackles
A tackle is often used instead against a player in possession of the ball. Although a bump can be a harder physical hit, however it is less likely to be effective in dispossessing a player of the ball and more likely to concede a freekick than a tackle.  Additionally, an effective tackle can rewarded with a free kick, whereas a bump cannot. Like tackles, a bump from behind will often cause a push in the back and the penalty is a freekick.

Controversy
The following shepherding incidents have been reviewed by the AFL match review panel, AFL Tribunal and AFL Rules Committee and therefore surrounded by media attention and controversy.

Long / Simmonds Incident (2000) 
In the 2000 AFL Grand Final, Essendon's Michael Long bumped Melbourne's Troy Simmonds while his head was over the ball, causing Simmonds to be knocked out and carried off the ground on a stretcher.  Given the large audience of the AFL Grand Final, the AFL applied a significant penalty and in the first major crackdown on head high bumps, the league handed Long a four match suspension for engaging in rough play.

Pickett / Begley Incident (2005) 

The game's governing body, the AFL, set a precedent in 2005 when it charged Byron Pickett with rough play for bumping James Begley with his head over the ball during the pre-season NAB Cup, even though both players were involved in the contest.  The incident caused controversy and many commentators had called to "Ban the Bump".   The league's reaction in suspending Pickett for six matches also caused controversy, accused by many of handing Pickett a heavier penalty and inventing a new rule and using a vague ruling to unnecessarily victimise Pickett.  In response, the league progressively introduced a range of new interpretations giving it the power to penalise players for similar actions.  Many players had learned the game and grown up knowing how to protect themselves and with the instinct to bump in these situations and the rule changes drew criticisms for these reasons.

Giansiracusa / Koschitzke Incident (2006) 

In 2006, Justin Koschitzke was rendered unconscious by Daniel Giansiracusa with a legal hip and shoulder after both players accidentally clashed heads.  Koschitzke appeared not to be aware of the oncoming Giansiracusa bump. However the AFL tribunal later cleared Giansiracusa of any wrongdoing. Koschitzke was diagnosed with a fractured skull, and was expected to miss 4–6 weeks.  The incident sparked a media circus in many parts of Australia.  This intensified when Koschitzke later dramatically fainted during a television interview.  Many immediately assumed it was connected to the bump and head injury, however subsequent brain scans found nothing abnormal.  In future matches, Koschitzke wore a soft head padding to protect himself.

Notting / Caracella Incident (2006) 

The bump caused further controversy later in 2006, when Blake Caracella suffered a career-ending neck injury after an accidental bump from former teammate Tim Notting which fracturing several vertebrae and bruising his spinal cord. The injury horrified the football community.  AFL CEO Andrew Demetriou saying that the speed of the game and the professionalism and physiques of modern AFL players were to blame (something that recent AFL rules have actually been designed to increase).  In a speech, he used the unfortunate phrase "break neck speed" to highlight the problem.  Caracella revealed that scans had shown his spinal column was naturally narrower than average. This condition would have ruled out a career in any professional contact sport had it been diagnosed earlier, and added to the sense of relief that the injury was not considerably more serious. However, he claims that he now suffers virtually no ill effects resulting from the collision.  Other players, such as Carlton's Nick Stevens, have sustained similar injuries.

2007 Rule Interpretations and Penalties 
The league introduced further rule interpretations in 2006, highlighting these incidents as examples.  It continues to be accused of inconsistency and a lack of clarity in the interpretation of such rules, particularly after a bump incident involving Collingwood's Alan Didak's elbow. Brodie Holland (on Brett Montgomery) and Ben Johnson (on Daniel Bell) have attracted maximum penalties (the same number of weeks as Pickett's 2005 bump) for bumps of this nature.  In defence, the AFL has released reports by medical experts claiming that serious head and neck injuries could be caused by this type of bumping, especially at high speeds.   Despite these claims, the only case of quadriplegia in the history of Aussie Rules was suffered by Footscray's Neil Sachse in the 1970s, and which was both accidental and not related to a bump.

Ablett Jr. / Wirrpanda Incident (2008) 

In 2008, the bump was again in the spotlight.  During a match between Geelong and West Coast at Kardinia Park, Gary Ablett, Jr. executed an old fashioned front-on bump or shirtfront on David Wirrpanda as both players ran at full speed from opposite directions.  Ablett flattened Wirrpanda with his hip and shoulder which appeared on video to be legal.  Both players played on without visible injury.  Later published photographs of the incident revealed head high contact during the shirtfront bump, Wirrpanda had slid to the ground causing incidental contact to be made to his head.  The AFL match review panel ruled the severe impact of the collision as rough play and charged Ablett. Geelong appealed the decision.  The AFL tribunal subsequently cleared Ablett of any wrongdoing despite the forceful front-on bump and headhigh contact.

Maxwell / McGinnity Incident (2009) 

Further controversy during the 2009 NAB Cup again brought the bump under scrutiny from the AFL match review panel.  In a match between Collingwood and West Coast, Collingwood captain Nick Maxwell executed a side to front on bump on young opponent Patrick McGinnity as they contested the loose ball.  Although McGinnity's head was not over the ball and he was within 5 metres of the ball so would have reasonably expected contact, Maxwell's copybook bump executed with the hip and shoulder resulted in an incidental clash of heads from the impact broke McGinnity's jaw and sideline him for up to 10 weeks.  Some argued that Maxwell's eyes were taken off the ball, and that his sole intent was to take McGinnity out of play.  The AFL Tribunal handed Maxwell a 4-week suspension ruling that Maxwell had a duty of care, even in a split second onfield decision to commit to a bump.  Several media commentators including Mike Sheahan and AFL greats Kevin Bartlett and Nathan Buckley claimed that the decision brought into question the very fabric of the game and could set a precedent which would see the innate physicality and unpredictability which endears the game to spectators to be removed.  However some, such as Rodney Eade defended the AFL's position. Collingwood launched a successful appeal, the only one under the current judicial system, and the decision was completely reversed. However weeks later, in light of clearing Maxwell, the AFL announced it intended to clarify the rules further to prevent similar appeals.

Viney / Lynch Incident (2014) 

Controversy surrounded an incident in Round 7, 2014 when Melbourne Football club player Jack Viney applied a bump on Adelaide Crows player Tom Lynch. Both players contested the ball from opposite directions. Viney arrived slightly later and as Lynch gained possession and was tackled by Alex Georgiou turning his body to protect himself from impact. The resulting collision, regarded by many as accidental, saw Lynch sandwiched between the two opponents and his head to clash with that of Gergiou, resulting in Lynch sustaining a broken jaw. Viney was referred straight to the tribunal, where he was suspended for two games, with the jury concluding that Viney could have avoided the collision. However, the Melbourne Football Club appealed the verdict, and the ruling was subsequently overturned. The decision attracted considerable media attention as many angered AFL fans expressed their concern for the spirit of the game.

Dangerfield / Kelly Incident (2021) 

The football community was once again divided in Round 1, 2021 when a bump by Brownlow medallist Geelong's Patrick Dangerfield on Adelaide's Jake Kelly and clash of heads resulted in concussion and broken nose to Kelly and a 3 match ban for Dangerfield for rough, reckless, high contact. Other than the accidental head clash, the bump appeared to be well executed and inconsistency in the tribunal ruling had many commentators once again calling for it to be banned to eliminate the grey area around it.

References 

Australian rules football terminology